Michael Williams (born 1 June 1971) is a Vincentian sprinter. He competed at the 1988 Summer Olympics and the 1992 Summer Olympics.

Career
Williams was part of the first Saint Vincent and the Grenadines team to compete at the Summer Olympics in 1988 at Seoul, South Korea, he was the youngest member of the team and at 17 years 116 days he still is the youngest Vincentian to compete at the Summer Olympics to date. In Seoul Williams competed in the 400 metres he ran in heat 6 in a time of 51.22 seconds and came in 7th out of the seven runners so didn't qualify for the next round.

Four years later he was running in his second Summer Olympics this time held in Barcelona, Spain, this time he was competing with teammates Lenford O'Garro, Eversley Linley and Eswort Coombs in the 4 x 400 metres relay, between them they ran in a time of 3:10.21, and finished seventh in there heat after Barbados got disqualified which was 11 seconds behind the USA team which included Michael Johnson, so they didn't qualify for the next round.

References

1964 births
Living people
Saint Vincent and the Grenadines male sprinters
Olympic athletes of Saint Vincent and the Grenadines
Athletes (track and field) at the 1988 Summer Olympics
Athletes (track and field) at the 1992 Summer Olympics
Place of birth missing (living people)